This is a List of FIA Formula 3 European  Championship drivers, that is, a list of drivers who have made at least one race start in the FIA Formula 3 European Championship. Drivers of the FIA European Formula 3 Championship which held in the 1975–1984 are not included. This list is accurate up to the end of the 2018 FIA Formula 3 European Championship.

By name

By racing license

Footnotes

References

 
European Formula 3 Championship drivers